Franck Citeau (born 12 March 1969) is a French sailor. He competed in the Tornado event at the 1996 Summer Olympics.

References

External links
 

1969 births
Living people
French male sailors (sport)
Olympic sailors of France
Sailors at the 1996 Summer Olympics – Tornado
Sportspeople from Loire-Atlantique
20th-century French people